The 1990–91 Edmonton Oilers season was the Oilers' 12th season in the NHL, and they were coming off of their 5th Stanley Cup in the last 7 seasons, after defeating the Boston Bruins in the Stanley Cup finals.  The Oilers would finish the season with a 37–37–6 record for 80 points, their lowest point total since 1980–81, and Edmonton scored a franchise low 272 goals, however, the Oilers set a franchise record for fewest goals against, with 272. After a 2–11–2 start to the season, the Oilers rebounded and finished 3rd in the Smythe Division and continued their playoff streak of making the playoffs every year they've been in the NHL.

Prior to the season, long time Oiler Jari Kurri left the team due to a contract dispute signing with Italian club Milano Devils, leaving a big hole on the team's top line. Injuries also hurt the Oilers, as Mark Messier missed 29 games due to injuries, and his 64 points was his lowest total since 1984–85. Messier also matched the lowest goal total of his career with 12, which matched his rookie season total back in 1979–80. Esa Tikkanen led the club in points with 69, while Petr Klíma scored a career high 40 goals to lead Edmonton in that department. Steve Smith would lead the Oilers defense with 54 points, and his 193 penalty minutes led the club.

In goal, Bill Ranford had a solid season, winning a team high 27 games and posting a 3.20 GAA. Grant Fuhr was suspended by the NHL for the season, but the suspension was lifted by the league after 59 games and his completion of a two-week rehab program, finishing out the regular season with a solid 6–4–3 record and a 3.01 GAA.

The Oilers finished the regular season with the fewest short-handed goals allowed (4).

Season standings

Schedule and results

Playoffs
In the playoffs, the Oilers faced their Battle of Alberta rivals, the Calgary Flames, who finished with 20 more points than they did, were huge favourites to win the series. The series went the full 7 games, with the Oilers winning the series in OT at the Saddledome in Calgary to advance to the division finals. There, they met the Los Angeles Kings, who finished 22 points better than Edmonton, however, the Oilers overtime magic continued after dropping game one, as Edmonton won 2 games in a row in double OT to take the series lead. Edmonton won the series in 6 games, clinching the series in OT. Having defeated the top two teams of their division, the Oilers advanced to the Conference Finals, facing the even more surprising Minnesota North Stars, who finished the season 12 games under .500, yet defeated the Presidents' Trophy winning Chicago Blackhawks and the St. Louis Blues, who finished 1 point behind Chicago, to make it to the 3rd round against Edmonton. The North Stars cinderella playoff run continued, as they defeated the Oilers in 5 games, ending Edmonton's chance for back-to-back Stanley Cups.

Season stats

Scoring leaders

Goaltending

Playoff stats

Scoring leaders

Goaltending

Awards and records

Awards

Milestones

Transactions

Trades

Free agents

Draft picks
Edmonton's draft picks at the 1990 NHL Entry Draft

References

 National Hockey League Guide & Record Book 2007

Edmonton Oilers season, 1990-91
Edmon
Edmonton Oilers seasons